Harry Bohrer (1916 – 2 October 1985) was a Czechoslovakian journalist. Bohrer is one of the founders of the news magazine Der Spiegel.

Bibliography 
 Betr.: Harry Bohrer. In: Der Spiegel. 41 /1985, 7. October 1985.
 Leo Brawand: Die Spiegel-Story. Wie alles anfing. Econ, Düsseldorf 1987, ISBN 3-430-11555-8.
 Leo Brawand: Der Spiegel – ein Besatzungskind. Wie die Pressefreiheit nach Deutschland kam. Europäische Verlagsanstalt, Hamburg 2007, ISBN 978-3-434-50604-1.
 Peter Merseburger: Rudolf Augstein. Biografie. Deutsche Verlags-Anstalt, München 2007, ISBN 978-3-421-05852-2.

References

1916 births
1985 deaths
Der Spiegel people
British people of Czech descent
20th-century publishers (people)
People who emigrated to escape Nazism
Czechoslovak emigrants to the United Kingdom
British Army personnel of World War II
Czechoslovak military personnel of World War II